The Black Widow is a 2016 spy novel by Daniel Silva. It is the sixteenth novel in the Gabriel Allon series. It was released on July 12, 2016.

Plot 
Gabriel Allon is expected to become the chief of Israel’s secret intelligence service. However, on the eve of his promotion, ISIS has detonated a massive bomb in the Marais district of Paris. He had to enter the field for one final operation.

References

External links
 Daniel Silva - Official Website (Book: The Black Widow)
 goodreads.com
 Transcript of Hugh Hewitt interviewing Daniel Silva on the Hugh Hewitt Show on July 4, 2016

Novels by Daniel Silva
2016 American novels
HarperCollins books